John Joe Barry (5 October 1925 – 9 December 1994) was an Irish middle-distance runner. He competed in the men's 1500 metres at the 1948 Summer Olympics.

References

1925 births
1994 deaths
Athletes (track and field) at the 1948 Summer Olympics
Irish male middle-distance runners
Irish male long-distance runners
Olympic athletes of Ireland
Sportspeople from Joliet, Illinois
Track and field athletes from Illinois